Ta na manga is an illusionist duo from Portugal, consisting of magicians Gonçalo Jorge and Pedro Teixeira.

History 
The duo was formed in 2004 when the two magician friends got together and decided to create an original show that integrated theatre, music and comedy with magic.

Together they created the show “Tá na manga ao quadrado” (Ta na manga squared) that debuted in Sociedade de Instrução Guilherme Cossoul in 2008 in Lisbon, and “Magia e etc. (não necessariamente nesta ordem)” (Magic  and etcetera, not necessarily in that order) that debuted in 2010 in Teatro da Comuna also in Lisbon.

Ta na manga's magic act has received  eleven awards at international magic events, including at the FISM World Championship of Magic in July 2012. Other important awards include the 1st prize in General Magic at the French Championship of Magic in 2009, the 1st prize at the 27th Brussels Magic Convention in 2009, the audience award at the Frakson Memorial Convention 2010 at Madrid and the IBM British Ring Shield in the United Kingdom in 2011.
In October 2011 they were awarded the Mandrake d'Or by the French Academy of Illusionists.

In July 2011 they performed at the world famous Magic Castle in Hollywood.

In June 2013 they performed on the television show Le plus grand cabaret du monde, broadcast by the French television network France 2 and TV5 Monde.

Gonçalo Jorge and Pedro Teixeira are members of the International Brotherhood of Magicians and the Associação Portuguesa de Ilusionismo. These societies are included in the Fédération Internationale des Sociétés Magiques.

Awards 
2012: FISM World Championship of Magic - Fédération Internationale des Sociétés Magiques - 3rd Prize in General Magic;
2011: Associação Portuguesa de Ilusionismo - Magicians of the Year (API award) - API;
2011: Mandrake d'Or - Académie française des Illusionnistes;
2011: International Brotherhood of Magicians British Ring - British Ring Shield (1st Prize in Stage Magic);
2010: Sociedad Española de Ilusionismo - 2nd Prize in General Magic - Spanish Championship of Magic - SEI;
2010: Circulo Mágico de Menorca CIMAPS - Special General Magic Award;
2010: Frakson Memorial Convention - Audience Award (Páginas Award);
2010: MagicValongo Magic Festival - 2nd Prize in General Magic;
2009: Fédération Française des Artistes Prestidigitateurs - 1st Prize in General Magic - French Championship of Magic - FFAP;
2009: Royal Club des Magiciens de Bruxelles - 1st Prize in General Magic - Brussels Championship of Magic;
2009: Club Magico Italiano - 3rd Prize in General Magic - Italian Championship of Magic - CMI.

References 

Magicians
Entertainer duos
Portuguese entertainers
Magician duos